Rae Stephenson (24 February 1955 – 30 April 2005) was a Jamaican cricketer. He played in one List A match for the Jamaican cricket team in 1979/80.

See also
 List of Jamaican representative cricketers

References

External links
 

1955 births
2005 deaths
Jamaican cricketers
Jamaica cricketers